Chung Hom Kok ( or ) is an area in the southern Hong Kong Island in Hong Kong. It is a popular site for barbecue and swimming with a beach and lifeguard services available from April to October. West of Stanley, Chung Hom Kok is referred to as the most southern point on a peninsula. The peninsula is also named Chung Hom Kok and the hill Chung Hom Shan occupies the largest part of the peninsula.

History
At the time of the 1911 census, the population of Chung Hom Kok was 10.

Features
Chung Hom Kok Beach is located on the western shore Chung Hom Kok in Chung Hom Wan.

A Home Ownership Scheme estate and a public housing estate is located in the Ma Hang area, to the northeast of Chung Hom Kok.

Signals intelligence history
Government Communications Headquarters established a signals intelligence centre at Chung Hom Kok in the late 1970s and consolidated operations there in 1982; the site closed in 1995.

Education
Chung Hom Kok is in Primary One Admission (POA) School Net 18. Within the school net are multiple aided schools (operated independently but funded with government money) and Hong Kong Southern District Government
Primary School.

See also
 Cheshire Home, Chung Hom Kok

References